The Pleasantville Community School District is a rural public school district headquartered in Pleasantville, Iowa.

The district spans western Marion County and eastern Warren County. The district serves Pleasantville, Beech, Swan, and the rural area surrounding Sandyville, excluding Sandyville's city limits which is part of Indianola School District,  and the surrounding rural areas.

Schools
The district has three schools in Pleasantville.
Pleasantville Elementary School
Pleasantville Middle School
Pleasantville Senior High School

Pleasantville High School

Athletics
The Trojans compete in the West Central Activities Conference in the following sports:
Cross Country
Volleyball
Football
Basketball
Wrestling
Track and Field
Golf 
 Girls' 2-time State Champions (1993, 2011)
Baseball
Softball

See also
List of school districts in Iowa
List of high schools in Iowa

References

External links
 

School districts in Iowa
Education in Marion County, Iowa
Education in Warren County, Iowa